This is a list of airports in Ukraine grouped by type and sorted by location. All aviation infrastructure of Ukraine is being supervised and regulated by the State Aviation Service of Ukraine (until 2010 the State Aviation Administration of Ukraine). The service issues certificates for all airports in the country and keeps a registry of all aircraft.

There are over 20 airports in Ukraine. Due to the 2014 Russian annexation of Crimea and the war in Donbas, Ukrainian aviation authorities were forced to revoke certificates for airports within the area of military operation as there are no positive control over airports in Crimea and eastern Ukraine's Donbas region.

Most airports and aerodromes of Ukraine were originally built for military purposes and some are still being used concurrently by the Ukrainian Armed Forces. Ukraine's central airport in Boryspil shares its airstrip with the Boryspil Air Base. In addition to airports, there are 11 airfields (aerodromes) and some 35 air strips (take off and landing strips) that are being operated separately. More information is available at the State Aviation Administration of Ukraine official website.

The Boryspil International Airport is the country's central and top rated airport. Other top rated airports include Lviv Danylo Halytskyi International Airport, Hostomel Airport (Antonov-1) and Ozerne Airport (near Zhytomyr), the last two being cargo-only airports. Among the busiest airports are Boryspil Airport, Lviv Danylo Halytskyi International Airport, Kyiv International Airport. Before the Russian annexation of Crimea and the outbreak of the war in Donbas there were also Simferopol International Airport and Donetsk International Airport.

On 24 February 2022, Ukraine closed its airspace to civilian flights due to the Russian invasion.


International airports 

Airport names shown in bold indicate the airport has scheduled service on commercial airlines. However, as of 25 February 2022, scheduled services into Ukraine have been suspended.

Other airports

Military air bases

Registered Heliports

See also

 Transport in Ukraine
 List of the busiest airports in Ukraine
 List of the busiest airports in Europe
 List of the busiest airports in the former USSR
 List of airports by ICAO code: U#UK - Ukraine
 Wikipedia: WikiProject Aviation/Airline destination lists: Europe#Ukraine

Notes

References 

 State Aviation Administration of Ukraine 
 
 
  - includes IATA codes
 Ukraine Airfields at GlobalSecurity.org
Map of civil airfields in Ukraine
 Great Circle Mapper: Airports in Ukraine - IATA and ICAO codes

External links
 Lists of airports in Ukraine:
 Aircraft Charter World
 The Airport Guide
 World Aero Data
 FallingRain
 List of airports from the State Aviation Service of Ukraine website

 01
Ukraine
Airports
Airports
A
Ukraine